Jasmine Garner (born 8 July 1994) is an Australian rules footballer with  in the AFL Women's (AFLW) competition.

Early life
Garner grew up supporting the Carlton Football Club, and Anthony Koutoufides was her favourite player. She started playing local football at the Yarraville Football Club at the age of eight, but later went through a stage of "not really enjoying playing footy anymore".

Inspired by the women's exhibition games that took place in the years prior to the conception of the AFL Women's competition, Garner juggled local football with her day job as an apprentice landscaper.

AFL Women's career
Garner made her AFLW debut in round 1 of 2017, playing for Collingwood in the competition's inaugural match at IKON Park against . During the opening quarter, she kicked the league's first-ever goal (her team's only goal in the 35-point loss).

Collingwood re-signed Garner for the 2018 season during the trade period in May 2017. On 2 September, she played for Victoria in the inaugural AFL Women's State of Origin match, and was named among her team's best players with a game-high (and career-best) five goals.

In May 2018, Garner accepted an offer to join expansion club . Her first season with the club led to selection in the All-Australian team as a half-forward. She received greater acclaim for her performances during the 2020 season, winning the AFLPA Most Valuable Player and AFLCA Champion Player of the Year awards. Garner also claimed her first club best and fairest award, as well as earning her second All-Australian selection. However, she was "stunningly overlooked" in the league best and fairest count, polling just four votes.

She capped off the season by winning her second club best and fairest award. Garner had another strong season in 2022, leading the goalkicking for North Melbourne for the second year in a row while also earning her fourth consecutive All-Australian selection and being named captain of the All-Australian side. She re-signed with the club in June 2022 for a further two seasons. Garner came 11th overall in the AFLW’s best and fairest award in 2022, polling 12 votes across ten games.

Statistics
Statistics are correct to the end of the 2022 season.

|- style="background-color:#EAEAEA"
! scope="row" style="text-align:center" | 2017
| 
| 43 || 7 || 5 || 3 || 52 || 10 || 62 || 23 || 17 || 0.7 || 0.4 || 7.4 || 1.4 || 8.9 || 3.3 || 2.4 || 1
|-
! scope="row" style="text-align:center" | 2018
| 
| 43 || 7 || 5 || 3 || 67 || 20 || 87 || 29 || 32 || 0.7 || 0.4 || 9.6 || 2.9 || 12.4 || 4.1 || 4.6 || 3
|- style="background-color:#EAEAEA"
! scope="row" style="text-align:center" | 2019
| 
| 25 || 7 || 5 || 4 || 68 || 24	|| 92 || 25 || 15 || 0.7 || 0.6 || 9.7 || 3.4 || 13.1 || 3.6 || 2.1 || 0
|-
! scope="row" style="text-align:center" | 2020
| 
| 25 || 7 || 8 || 3 || 99 || 42 || 141 || 32 || 33 || 1.1 || 0.4 || 14.1 || 6.0 || 20.1 || 4.6 || 4.6 || 4
|-  style="background-color:#EAEAEA"
! scope="row" style="text-align:center" | 2021
| 
| 25 || 10 || 9 || 6 || 133 || 73 || 206 || 45 || 54 || 0.9 || 0.6 || 13.3 || 7.3 || 20.6 || 4.5 || 5.4 || 9
|-
! scope="row" style="text-align:center" | 2022
| 
| 25 || 11 || 11 || 5 || 144 || 86 || 230 || 45 || 42 || 1.0 || 0.5 || 13.1 || 7.8 || 20.9 || 4.1 || 3.8 || 11
|- class="sortbottom"
! colspan=3 | Career
! 49
! 43
! 24
! 563
! 255
! 818
! 199
! 193
! 0.9
! 0.5
! 11.5
! 5.2
! 16.7
! 4.1
! 3.9
! 28
|}

References

External links

Living people
1994 births
Collingwood Football Club (AFLW) players
Australian rules footballers from Melbourne
Sportswomen from Victoria (Australia)
North Melbourne Football Club (AFLW) players